John Lee (4 November 1920 – 12 January 1995) was an English footballer who played as a forward. He scored 136 goals from 231 appearances in the Football League playing for Leicester City, Derby County and Coventry City, and was capped once by England. Lee was born in Sileby, Leicestershire and died in Rugby, Warwickshire, and also played first-class cricket for Leicestershire.

Lee began his professional career with Leicester City, moving to Derby County in 1950. He won his only England cap that same year when he played and scored in their 4–1 win over Northern Ireland at Windsor Park. He finished his career in 1955 at Coventry City.

At cricket, Lee was a right-handed batsman and a right-arm medium-pace bowler. He made a single first-class appearance for Leicestershire, in 1947, against Glamorgan. Lee scored 3 runs in the first innings and a duck in the second, and took 1/13 from four overs.

References

1920 births
1995 deaths
People from Sileby
Footballers from Leicestershire
English cricketers
Leicestershire cricketers
English footballers
Association football forwards
England international footballers
Leicester City F.C. players
Derby County F.C. players
Coventry City F.C. players
English Football League players
Quorn F.C. players
FA Cup Final players